Western Oregon University (WOU) is a public university in Monmouth, Oregon. It was originally established in 1856 by Disciples of Christ pioneers as Monmouth University. Subsequent names included Oregon State Normal School, Oregon College of Education, and Western Oregon State College. Western Oregon University incorporates both the College of Education and the College of Liberal Arts and Sciences. Enrollment is approximately 3,750 students.

History

Establishment

Western Oregon University was founded in 1856 as Monmouth University. In 1865, it merged with another private institution, Bethel College, in Bethel and became Christian College. In 1882, the Oregon State Legislature approved the college's bid to become a state-supported teacher training (or "normal") school, Oregon State Normal School.

In November 1910, an initiative petition (Measure 10) to establish a normal school at Monmouth, passed by 55.6%. The name was changed, for the fourth time, to Oregon Normal School. On the same ballot were two other measures to additionally establish normal schools in Ashland and Weston:  both failed.

Growth

A period of growth was experienced in the 1920s during which the school's enrollment more than tripled from 316 in 1920 to peak at the 990 mark in 1927. With the coming of the Great Depression attendance tailed off slightly, with an average attendance in 1930 of 705 students, hitting a nadir in the 1933–34 academic year. Attendance rebounded later in the decade, topping the 1,000 mark for the first time during the 1938–39 academic year, with a total enrollment including summer session of 1,017.

In 1939, the Oregon Legislature changed the name for the fifth time, to Oregon College of Education. The school entered an extended period of growth, except for a period during World War II when college enrollments dropped nationwide. New programs were added in the areas of liberal arts and sciences.

Name changes

In 1981, the institution was renamed Western Oregon State College to reflect the school's growing academic programs in the liberal arts fields. In 1997 the name was updated to Western Oregon University, reflecting the university's broader academic mission and profile.

Academics 
Western Oregon University offers bachelor's degrees (BA, BS, BM, BFA), and AB  through its two colleges: the College of Education and the College of Liberal Arts and Sciences. Master's degrees are available in Education (MAT and MSEd), Rehabilitation Counseling (MS), Criminal Justice (MA), Music (MM), and Management and Information Systems (MS). In 2015, U.S. News & World Report ranked Western as the 77th best amongst the regional universities in the west.

Organization

College of Education 
WOU's College of Education is divided into: Division of Education and Leadership, Division of Deaf Studies and Professional Studies, and Division of Health and Exercise Science.

Several programs in the division have received awards.  The ASL Interpreting Studies program received the Sorenson VRS Award of Excellence in 2008. The Teacher Education Program was recognized in 2010 by the American Association of State Colleges and Universities as the recipient of the Christa McAuliffe Award for Excellence in Teacher Education.

College of Liberal Arts and Sciences
The College of Liberal Arts and Sciences offers 30 bachelor's degrees in seven academic divisions: Behavioral Science, Business and Economics, Computer Science, Creative Arts, Humanities, Natural Sciences and Mathematics, and Social Science. The Communications Studies Program received the 2008 Rex Mix Award for Excellence from the National Communication Association.

Athletics

The Western Oregon athletic teams are called the Wolves. The university is a member of the Division II level of the National Collegiate Athletic Association (NCAA), primarily competing in the Great Northwest Athletic Conference (GNAC) since the 2001–02 academic year. The Wolves previously competed in the D-II Pacific West Conference (PacWest) from 1998–99 to 2000–01; and in the Cascade Collegiate Conference (CCC) of the National Association of Intercollegiate Athletics (NAIA) from 1993–94 to 1997–98 (although they remained in the CCC as an affiliate member for some sports from 1998–99 to 1999–2000).

Western Oregon competes in 12 intercollegiate varsity sports: Men's sports include baseball, basketball, cross country, football, soccer and track & field; while women's sports include basketball, cross country, soccer, softball, track & field and volleyball.

Accomplishments
Within their history under the NAIA prior to their transition to the NCAA, Western Oregon won multiple NAIA national titles in women's basketball. The baseball team on campus has experienced much success in the GNAC, winning ten consecutive conference titles since 2001. The track and field teams have also performed well within the conference, with the men's team winning four consecutive GNAC Indoor Track titles since 2008. In the fall of 2010, the men's and women's cross country teams earned their first berths in school history to the NCAA National Championships where they placed 20th and 21st, respectively. Most recently the men's basketball team has won back to back conference titles.

Awards

WOU Veterans Resource Center selected as Chapter of the Year by the Student Veterans of America in 2018.

WOU was one of two universities highlighted for its success in graduating Pell Grant recipients in its 2015 report, The Pell Partnership: Ensuring a Shared Responsibility for Low-Income Student Success.

WOU was an inaugural winner of the Higher Education Excellence in Diversity (HEED) award recognized by Insight Into Higher Education on November 15, 2012. This award recognizes universities and colleges that have demonstrated the highest level of commitment and action towards fostering a campus community that celebrates all the many facets of diversity.

Ackerman Residence Hall, opened fall 2010, has received multiple awards for its environmentally friendly design and operations. Green Home Authority named Ackerman as one of the ten eco-friendliest dorms in the country in 2011. Mother Nature Network also listed Ackerman as one of the ten greenest dorms on the planet in 2010.

The National Academic Advising Association (NACADA) has recognized fourteen Western Oregon University faculty and staff for academic advising (three in 2008, one in 2009, two in 2010, two in 2011, one in 2012, four in 2013, and one in 2014).

In January 2010, The Education Trust named WOU in the top 10 of the nation for improved graduation rates among underrepresented minorities. WOU also ranked ninth in closing the gap between minority and nonminority graduation rates. WOU is one of the most diverse universities in Oregon and has the highest percentage of Latino students in the Oregon University System. Between 2000 and 2009, enrollment of Latino students increased 75%, Asian-American students by 53%, African-American students by 115% and Native American students by 63%, for an overall increase of these student populations of 73%.  The successful growth in Latino students has resulted in WOU being accepted as a member of the Hispanic Association of Colleges and Universities.

Notable alumni
 Kevin Boss – American football player for the New York Giants, Oakland Raiders, and Kansas City Chiefs
 Tony Burris – American football player, Arena Football League's Detroit Drive and Washington Commandos
 Jeff Charleston – American football player, New Orleans Saints
 Brian Greene – American football player
 Marco Hernandez – First Latino to serve as U.S. district court judge in Oregon.
 Robert Oberst – Professional strongman who competes yearly in The World's Strongest Man competition
 Bryce Peila – American football player, Arena Football League's Portland Thunder/Steel
 Jason Slowey – NFL Player for the Oakland Raiders
Dan Straily (born 1988), starting pitcher in the Philadelphia Phillies organization
 Mark Thorson – American football player
 Tyrell Williams – NFL wide receiver for the Las Vegas Raiders

Greek life
On May 18, 2012, the school was introduced to its first traditional Greek life with the organization and initiation of the Kappa Sigma fraternity, Sigma Tau chapter . The schools Greek system now consists of one traditional fraternity, one traditional sorority, one non-traditional fraternity and one non-traditional sorority. The school welcomed Alpha Chi Omega, its first traditional sorority in the fall of 2015 with the organization founding its chapter in 2016. On November 29, 2012, The Beta Kappa chapter of Omega Delta Phi fraternity was founded. Kappa Delta Chi is the other non-traditional sorority on campus.

References

External links

 
 Official athletics website

 
1856 establishments in Oregon Territory
Buildings and structures in Polk County, Oregon
Educational institutions established in 1856
Universities and colleges accredited by the Northwest Commission on Colleges and Universities
Tourist attractions in Polk County, Oregon
Public universities and colleges in Oregon